Dame Florence Edith Victoria Simpson,  (née Way, formerly Leach; 9 October 1874 – 5 September 1956) was the senior female British Army officer during World War I and Controller in Chief, later President, Queen Mary's Army Auxiliary Corps (formerly the Women's Army Auxiliary Corps).

Personal life and death
Florence Edith Victoria Way was born on 9 October 1874, the daughter of Colonel Wilfred FitzAlan Way and his wife, Henrietta Mary (née Ross).

She married firstly on 3 December 1895, Captain (later Brigadier-General) Henry Edmund Burleigh Leach. They divorced in 1920. She married secondly, Ernest Percy Simpson, a widower with two daughters in 1922. There were no children from either marriage. Her second husband died in 1925. In retirement, Dame Florence Simpson lived with her stepdaughters for many years in South Africa. She died at a clinic in Arlesheim, Switzerland on 5 September 1956, aged 81.

Career

Her career began in 1915 when she volunteered as a cook in the Women's Legion, an organisation founded by Lady Londonderry to provide "a capable and efficient body of women whose services could be offered to the state to take the place of men needed in the firing line or in other capacities". 

She became Commandant of the Military Cookery section of the Legion, taking on more and more catering for the Army. In February 1917 she was appointed Controller of Cooks and seven months later brought all 7000 Women's Legion cooks and waitresses into the Women's Army Auxiliary Corps, which had been formed earlier that year. Later she was appointed Controller of Recruiting for the WAAC and appointed Commander of the Order of the British Empire (CBE) in 1918.

In February 1918, she became Chief Controller of the WAAC at the War Office and five months later was promoted to Controller-in-Chief (Major-General), becoming the senior officer of 57,000 women serving at home and overseas. The Corps name was changed to Queen Mary's Army Auxiliary Corps, of which she was elected president. She retired from the QMAAC in 1920.

Death of her sister
Florence's sister, Violet Long, wife of Major W. E Long, was one of the Chief Controllers of the WAAC; she drowned while evacuating nurses from the Hospital Transport ship Warilda after it was torpedoed by a German U-boat on 3 August 1918. Violet Long was returning from France to give her sister a report on how the WAAC's detailed for service with the American Army overseas were progressing. She was the last woman to leave the ship.

Honours
In 1919, Leach was appointed Dame Commander of the Order of the British Empire (DBE), the first Dame Commander of the Military Division.

References

Sources

1874 births
1956 deaths
British Army personnel of World War I
British women in World War I
Dames Commander of the Order of the British Empire
Place of birth missing
British expatriates in Switzerland
Queen Mary's Army Auxiliary Corps officers